The Death of Monsieur Gallet (other English-language titles are Maigret Stonewalled and The Late Monsieur Gallet) is a detective novel by Belgian writer Georges Simenon. It is one of the earliest novels by Simenon featuring the detective Jules Maigret.

Other titles
The book has been translated three times into English: in 1932 by Anthony Abbot as The Death of Monsieur Gallet , in 1963 as Maigret Stonewalled by Margaret Marshall, and in 2013 by Anthea Bell as The Late Monsieur Gallet.

Adaptations
The novel has been adapted three times for film and television: in English in 1960 as  A Man of Quality, with Rupert Davies in the main role; in French in 1956 as Monsieur Gallet, décédé, directed by Jean Faucher with Henri Norbert in the main role; in French in 1987 as Monsieur Gallet, décédé, directed by Jean-Marie Coldefy with Jean Richard in the lead role.

References 

Maurice Piron, Michel Lemoine, L'Univers de Simenon, guide des romans et nouvelles (1931-1972) de Georges Simenon, Presses de la Cité, 1983, p. 256-257

External links

Maigret at trussel.com

1931 Belgian novels
Maigret novels
Novels set in France
Novels set in the 20th century